"No One" is a song recorded by Belgian/Dutch Eurodance band 2 Unlimited, released in September 1994 as the second single from their third album, Real Things (1994). Co-written by bandmembers Ray Slijngaard and Anita Dels, it was a top 10 hit in at least six countries, as well as on the Eurochart Hot 100, where the song reached number ten. It features a reference to "That's the Way Love Goes" by Janet Jackson and the accompanying music video, directed by La La Land, features the band performing on the beach by Great Barrier Reef in Australia.

Critical reception
In his weekly UK chart commentary, James Masterton commented, "What a nuisance. Here I am all set to launch an account of a new 2 Unlimited single with a witty precis of the melodic and formulaic similarity to everything else they have ever released and what happens? They go and release a track that sounds completely different to all the others! Joking aside, it is absolutely true, "No One" being the closest they will probably ever get to a conventional pop song and more deservedly a smash hit than some of their recent output. It could well end up their third Top 10 hit of the year and is now their 11th consecutive Top 20 hit." 

Pan-European magazine Music & Media wrote, "It's their first reggae attempt, and no one has blended it with Euro dance so seamlessly before." Alan Jones from Music Week gave the song four out of five, adding that "this is a good deal slower than usual, but still relies on the he-rap, she-sing template. Likely to garner less club support but may attract some first-time supporters." In an retrospective review, Pop Rescue said it "is probably the most mellow of their singles", adding that "it definitely feels like [a] light, summer track". James Hamilton from the RM Dance Update declared it as a "rapped (mentioning Janet Jackson!), cooed and organ wheezed attractive jaunty skipper".

Chart performance
The release scored chart success across Europe, peaking at number two in the Netherlands, number three in Belgium, number six in Finland, and number ten in both Denmark and Spain. In the United Kingdom, it was their least successful release to date, hitting number 17 in its first week at the UK Singles Chart on 25 September 1994. It also peaked at number 28 on the UK Dance Singles Chart. Additionally, the single was a top 20 hit also in Austria (14), France (19), Germany (18), Iceland (17), Ireland (18), Scotland (14), Sweden (15) and Switzerland (15). On the Eurochart Hot 100, it hit number ten, while reaching number six on MTV's European Top 20. On the Eurochart Hot 100 year-end chart, the single ended up as number 64. Outside Europe, "No One" was a sizeable top 20 hit in Israel, while in Australia, it peaked at number 70.

Music video
The accompanying music video for "No One" was directed by La La Land. It was shot by the Great Barrier Reef in Australia and features Anita and Ray performing on the beach. Sometimes Ray also performs in a tropical forest. "No One" was later published on 2 Unlimited's official YouTube channel in December 2013, and had generated more than 3 million views as of January 2023.

Appearances
The melody of this song was also sampled in 1994 single by Serbian group Moby Dick with name "Kralj kokaina" ("King of Cocaine").

Track listings

 7-inch single
 "No One" (Radio Edit)
 "No One" (Unlimited Remix Edit)

 European CD maxi
 "No One" (Radio Edit) – 3:27
 "No One" (Unlimited Remix-Extended) – 5:27
 "No One" (X-Out Remix) – 6:19
 "No One" (X-Out In Dub Remix) – 5:45
 "No One" (Doc Baron Mix) – 6:58
 "No One" (The It Goes Underground) – 6:36

 European 12-inch maxi
 "No One" (Unlimited Rmx-Extended) – 5:27
 "No One" (Extended) – 5:24
 "No One" (X-Out Remix) – 6:19
 "No One" (X-Out In Dub Remix) – 5:45

 Italian 12-inch maxi
 "No One" (Extended) – 5:24
 "No One" (X-Out Remix) – 6:19
 "No One" (Radio Edit) – 3:27
 "No One" (Unlimited Remix Extended) – 5:27
 "No One" (X-Out In Dub Remix) – 5:45
 "No One" (Unlimited Remix Edited) – 3:45

 UK CD single
 "No One" (Radio Edit) – 3:29
 "No One" (Unlimited Remix) – 5:29
 "No One" (Extended) – 5:26
 "No One" (X-Out Remix) – 6:21
 "No One" (X-Out In Dub Remix) – 5:45

Charts

Weekly charts

Year-end charts

References

1994 singles
1994 songs
2 Unlimited songs
Byte Records singles
English-language Dutch songs
Music videos directed by La La Land
Pete Waterman Entertainment singles
Songs about dreams
Songs written by Anita Doth
Songs written by Jean-Paul De Coster
Songs written by Phil Wilde
Songs written by Ray Slijngaard
ZYX Music singles